Mylor (postcode 5153) is a small village in the Adelaide Hills.

History
Mylor was surveyed in 1885, with a plan to develop the land as a focal point for orchard development in South Australia. The town was proclaimed in 1891 by Acting Governor of South Australia Sir James Boucaut who named it after his Cornish birthplace of Mylor.

Early inhabitants were strict Methodists, and due to their temperance belief no country pub was established, a quirk which has persisted into the current day. A church, school and a co-operative general store were among the early constructions of the town.

Current
Mylor retains a small village feel with a population of 939 (2006 census data). There is a Mylor country market held on the first Sunday of every month, from 9 am until 1 pm on the Mylor Oval. Mylor is a popular camping area, with many camps. Mylor Main Street hosts a large Hardware/Rural store (called Coopers), General Store, Post Office, and Cafe. There is also a Primary School, Fire Brigade, Uniting Church and Anglican Church. Mylor has a beautiful tree lined Oval that is used for Cricket and Soccer as well as Community Events and general use.

Mylor Country Fire Service

 
Mylor Country Fire Service are the volunteer fire service of Mylor.  Mylor CFS is one of the oldest brigades in the region, and pride themselves in being well trained and professional. They are part of the Mount Lofty CFS Group, which is part of the Country Fire Service.

Attractions
Nearby is Warrakilla estate, the 19th-century home of George Woodroffe Goyder, a former Surveyor General of South Australia.

See also
 Mylor Conservation Park
 Warrawong Sanctuary

References

Towns in South Australia